The 2019 Kosovar Supercup should have been the 28th edition of the Kosovar Supercup, an annual football match played between the winners of the previous season's Kosovo Superleague and Kosovar Cup competitions.

This year the Kosovar Supercup will not be held, due to Feronikeli winning both the 2018–19 Kosovo Superleague and the 2019 Kosovar Cup Final, making them automatically the winners of the Supercup. Instead a friendly match will be played between the winners and the runners-up of the 2018–19 Football Superleague of Kosovo.

See also 
2018–19 Football Superleague of Kosovo
2018–19 Kosovar Cup

References 

Supercup
Kosovar Supercup